Discreet Music is the fourth studio album by the British musician Brian Eno, and the first released under his full name (as opposed to simply "Eno"). The album is a minimalist work, with the A-side consisting of one 30-minute piece featuring synthesizer and tape delay. The B-side features three variations on Canon in D Major by Johann Pachelbel, performed by the Cockpit Ensemble and conducted by Gavin Bryars.

While his earlier collaborations with Robert Fripp and several selections from Another Green World (1975) feature similar ideas, Discreet Music marked a clear step toward the ambient aesthetic Eno would later codify with 1978's Ambient 1: Music for Airports.

Background

Brian Eno's concept of ambient music builds upon a concept composer Erik Satie called "furniture music". This means music that is intended to blend into the ambient atmosphere of the room rather than be directly focused upon. Like Satie's notion of music that could "mingle with the sound of the knives and forks at dinner", Discreet Music was created to play in, and blend with, the subtle background audio of various, or any given, situation.

The inspiration for this album began when Eno was left bed-ridden by an automobile accident and was given an album of eighteenth-century harp music by a visiting friend, Judy Nylon. After she left, according to the Discreet Music liner notes, Eno inadvertently played the harp album almost inaudibly, which "presented what was for me a new way of hearing music — as part of the ambience of the environment". Nylon recalled the event differently: "I put the harp music on and balanced it as best as I could from where I stood; [Eno] caught on immediately to what I was doing and helped me balance the softness of the rain patter with the faint string sound for where he lay in the room. There was no 'ambience by mistake'." Eno related another version in a 2011 interview: "[Nylon] put a record on and then left. The record was much too quiet but I couldn't reach to turn it up and it was raining outside ... I suddenly thought of this idea of making music that didn't impose itself on your space ... but created a sort of landscape you could belong to".

This album is also an experiment in generative composition. His intention was to explore multiple ways to create music with limited planning or intervention. Nicole V. Gagné described the album as "a minimalist work using tape-delay and synthesizer" that would lead to Eno's further experiments in ambient music.

In a 1979 interview with Lester Bangs, Eno called Discreet Music the most successful of his recordings, explaining that it "was done very, very easily, very quickly, very cheaply, with no pain or anguish over anything, and I still like it."

Recording
The A-side of the album is a thirty-minute piece originally intended as a background drone for guitarist Robert Fripp to play over in a series of concerts. Eno set up a synthesizer with built-in memory along with a tape delay system, but was immediately interrupted: "people started knocking on the door, and I was answering the phone and adjusting all this stuff as it ran. I almost made that without listening to it. It was really automatic music." The liner notes contain a diagram of how this piece was created. It begins with two melodic phrases of different lengths played back from a synthesizer's digital recall system. (The equipment used in this case was an EMS Synthi AKS, which had a then-exotic, built-in digital sequencer.) This signal is then run through a graphic equaliser to occasionally change its timbre. It is then run through an echo unit before being recorded onto a tape machine. The tape runs to the take-up reel of a second machine, and the output of that machine is fed back into the first tape machine which records the overlapped signals. The next day, Fripp visited and Eno accidentally played the piece back at half-speed, thinking that "it was probably one of the best things I’d ever done and I didn’t even realize I was doing it at the time."

The second half of the album consists of three related pieces, collectively titled "Three Variations on the Canon in D Major by Johann Pachelbel", performed by the Cockpit Ensemble, and conducted and co-arranged by Gavin Bryars. Eno described the music as the result of a self-generating, self-regulating system, with the input to the system taking the form of two- or four-measure fragments of Pachelbel's canon, and the system being the performers with a set of instructions. Each variation involves a different way of manipulating and overlaying the musical fragments. In the first piece, "Fullness of Wind", the players' tempos are decreased, with the rate of decrease being related to the relative pitch of the instruments, so that lower instruments are slowest. In the second piece, "French Catalogues", groups of notes are associated with time-related directions from different parts of the score. The third piece, "Brutal Ardour", presents the players with sequences of notes that are related but of different lengths. The titles of these pieces were derived from inaccurate French-to-English translations of the liner notes of a version of Pachelbel's Canon performed by the orchestra of Jean-Francois Paillard.

Release

Discreet Music was the third (of four) simultaneous releases on Eno's new Obscure Records label.

This album was re-released on the Virgin label in 2004. On CD reissues, a full minute of silence separates Discreet Music title track from the Pachelbel piece.

Reception and legacy

Reviewing for The Village Voice in June 1977, Robert Christgau stated that the album "encourages a meditative but secular mood (good for hard bits of writing) more effectively than any of the other rock-identified avant-garde music that's come our way". In 1979, Lester Bangs described it as "either the definitive unobtrusively lustrous statement on ambient musics or a wispy treacly bore that defies you to actually pay attention to it [...] depending on your point of view."

Trouser Press described the album as "striking and haunting, filled with beauty and apprehension, paralleling the minimalist music being made by Steve Reich and Philip Glass." AllMusic's Sean Westergaard said it is Eno's "first full foray into what has become known as ambient music," and added that "[the album's] reputation as a groundbreaking and influential work is surpassed only by its placid beauty."

This album was a favourite of David Bowie's, and led to his collaboration with Eno on Bowie's late '70s Berlin Trilogy.

For the 40th anniversary (2015) of the release of the album, the Canadian music ensemble Contact recorded "Discreet Music" with classical instruments as a seven-part one hour work.

Track listing

 Side A

"Discreet Music" (Brian Eno) – 30:35

 Side B

Three Variations on the Canon in D Major by Johann Pachelbel (Brian Eno)
"Fullness of Wind" – 9:57
"French Catalogues" – 5:18
"Brutal Ardour" – 8:17

Personnel 
Brian Eno – synthesizer, keyboards
Gavin Bryars – co-arranger and conductor on Side B
The Cockpit Ensemble – performer on Side B
Technical
Brian Eno – producer, photography
Peter Kelsey – engineer
Simon Heyworth – mastering
John Bonis – cover design
Andrew Day – redesign

See also
 Electronic music

References

Works cited

External links
 Liner notes from Discreet Music

Brian Eno albums
1975 albums
Albums produced by Brian Eno
E.G. Records albums
Ambient albums by English artists
Albums recorded at Trident Studios
Obscure Records albums